Elkins is a surname. Notable people with the surname include:

Aaron Elkins (born 1935), American mystery writer
Caroline Elkins (born 1959), American academic
Carolyn Elkins, American poet, teacher, and editor
Charlotte Elkins (born 1948), American author and wife of writer Aaron Elkins
Corey Elkins (born 1985), left wing for the Los Angeles Kings of the National Hockey League
 Dane Elkins (born 1999), American professional racquetball player
Darren Elkins, American mixed martial artist
Davis Elkins (1876–1959), American industrialist, son of Stephen Benton Elkins
Gary Elkins (born 1966), English football player
Gary Elkins (born 1955), American politician
Hillard Elkins ("Hilly" Elkins, born 1929), American theatre and film producer
Jim Elkins (Oregon criminal), crime boss in Portland, Oregon in the mid-20th century
James Elkins (art critic) (born 1954), art critic and art historian based in Chicago
John Elkins (1815-1898), American politician
Larry Elkins (born 1943), former American football player
Luther Elkins (1809–1887), American politician and pioneer in the state of Oregon
Margreta Elkins (1939–2009), Australian opera singer
Mike Elkins (born 1966), former quarterback in the National Football League and the World League of American Football
Bob Elkins (born 1932), American character actor who has appeared in movies, plays and television productions
Stanley Elkins, (1925-2013) American Historian, History Professor, Jewish Nonfiction Author who wrote:  “Slavery: a problem in American institutional and intellectual life” and “Age of Federalism” 
Steve Elkins (born 1951), American Cinematographer and Explorer 
Steven A. Elkins (born 1966), American Artist and Award-winning Texas BBQ Pitmaster
Stephen Benton Elkins (1841–1911), American industrialist, father of Davis Elkins
Terence James Elkins (born 1936), American physicist
William Lukens Elkins (1832-1903), American businessman and art collector
Wilson Homer Elkins (1909–1994), president of the University of Maryland from 1954 to 1978

See also
Harry Elkins Widener
Elkin (name)